Tambankulu Stadium is a 2,000-seat association football stadium in Tambankulu, Eswatini. It is home to Tambankulu Callies FC of the Premier League of Eswatini.

References

External links 
Soccerway profile

Sports venues in Eswatini
Football venues in Eswatini